Deadline Gallipoli is an Australian television drama mini-series, first screened on Foxtel's Showcase channel on 19 and 20 April 2015. The two-part series explores the Gallipoli Campaign from the point of view of war correspondents Ellis Ashmead-Bartlett, Charles Bean, Keith Murdoch, and Phillip Schuler. The show was produced by the Australian producer John Schwarz.

Cast
 Joel Jackson as Charles Bean
 Sam Worthington as Phillip Schuler
 Hugh Dancy as Ellis Ashmead-Bartlett
 Ewen Leslie as Keith Murdoch
 Charles Dance as General Hamilton
 Rachel Griffiths as Lady Hamilton
 Anna Torv as Lady Gwendoline Churchill
 Jessica De Gouw as Vera Grant 
 James Fraser as Bazley
 Laurence Boxhall as Jimmy Paradise
 Luke Ford as Charlie Hodson
 Bryan Brown as General Bridges
 Daniel Wyllie as Captain Frank Elliot
 John Bell as Lord Kitchener
 Huw Higginson as General Birdwood
 Robert Rabiah as Mehmet 
 Nick Pelomis as Michaelis
 Justin Smith as Lester Lawrence

Accolades

References

External links
 
 
 
 Official Website
 Production website

2010s Australian drama television series
English-language television shows
World War I television drama series
ANZAC (Australia)
Television series by Matchbox Pictures
Films directed by Michael Rymer
Films about the Gallipoli campaign